St Helens is a town and Metropolitan Borough in Merseyside, England. The Borough Council is the area’s local authority, and so is responsible for the development and maintenance of learning establishments in the region.

The Children & Young People's Services is the primary Department, with several sub-divisions responsible in part for meeting education needs and national standards:
Performance and Strategy
Resources and Support Services
Achievement and Inclusion
Integrated and Specialist Services

History of education authorities in St Helens
From 1870 until 1902 the Education centres in the town and borough were operated by School Boards responsible for promoting and developing scholastic learning in the local area. The Education Act 1902 established grounds requiring the formation of a Local Education Authority responsible for the development and maintenance of schools within the Local Authority, superseding the School Board.

Between 1902 and 1988 St Helens LEA was responsible for monitoring and developing all the Boroughs schools and learning centres from pre-school through to Further Education establishments. The 1902 provision granted purview to monitor and provide overview to Religious Education establishments. The Education Reform Act 1988 relieved the LEA of its duties over Further Education establishments. St Helens Polytechnic / College became a corporation at that point.

The Children Act 2004 required the formation of the a Director of Children's Services, drawing the Children's Services and LEA operating services fully under the umbrella of the Local Authority and abolishing references to an LEA.

The modern role of the education authority in St Helens
The Council provides many services with regards to the operation of the schools within the borough working closely with the schools in the formation of Governing Bodies.  The Council is also responsible for admissions, transport and library services. The authority is also responsible for coordinating with other benefit departments for the operation and catering of school meals, and the free school meal service.

The Council provides several services in addition to schools. Initiatives such as Adult education courses are operated from Libraries, schools, and education centres across the borough providing learning opportunities specialising in Adult Literacy & Numeracy, Computers, First Aid, Languages and skills for work.

Coordinating with other agencies
St Helens Council operates their education services in association with several Government and Private schemes and initiatives. The Council has coordinated with the Sure Start service.

The Building Schools for the Future scheme was involved in the redevelopment of Cowley Language School.

List of schools

Further education colleges
A list of Further Education establishments in St Helens:

Carmel College
St Helens College
Rainhill Sixth Form Centre
Cronton College

References

External links
Schools in St Helens data provided by EduBase, department of Education

Local authority & schemes
St Helens Council Homepage
St Helens PE & School Sport Homepage

Partner organisations
Department for Business Innovation & Skills
Learn Direct
NIACE - The National Institute of Adult Continuing Education
Ofsted homepage, Office for Standards in Education, Children’s Services and Skills
Starting Point
St Helens District Council for Voluntary Services
The Learning and Skills Council

Education establishment homepages
Carmel College
Cowley Language School
St Augustine of Canterbury Catholic School
St Cuthberts Community College
De La Salle School
Haydock Sports College
Rainford High Technology College
Rainhill High School Media Arts College
St Helens College
St Helens Library Virtual Learning Service
Sutton High Sports College
Tower College, Rainhill

St Helens
Education in St Helens, Merseyside